Collagen, type XXVIII, alpha 1 also known as COL28A1 is a protein that in humans is encoded by the COL28A1 gene. This protein belongs to a class of collagens that contain von Willebrand factor type A domains. The protein is encoded by the COL28A1 gene which contains 45 exons and is found of the p arm of chromosome 7.

References 

Collagens